The Screen Nation Film & TV Awards, formerly the bfm (black filmmaker) Film and TV Awards, was founded in September 2003 by independent film producer Charles Thompson MBE, as a platform to raise the profile of black British and international film and television talent of African heritage.

Statuette
The Screen Nation Award statuette is based on a West African mask and was designed by Jamaican-born sculptor George "Fowokan" Kelly. "The statuette signifies via the mask that there is a change coming. A mask takes you from one state into another and in this case from being unrecognized and unrewarded to being recognized and celebrated".

Awards
The Screen Nation Film and TV Awards are given at a televised event that normally takes place in October during UK Black History Month. The awards ceremony—dubbed the "Black BAFTAs" by The Independent newspaper in 2003—brings together actors, actresses, directors and filmmakers from the British and international film and TV industry.

In 2016, Earl Cameron became the first inductee into the Screen Nation "Hall of Frame" at the BFI Southbank, where he was interviewed by Samira Ahmed.

Voting
The Screen Nation Film and TV Awards are based on voting by the general public as well as the Screen Nation committee. The honorary and major awards, such as the Outstanding Contribution to Film and TV Award and the Edric Connor Inspiration Award, are decided by the Screen Nation Executive committee. The People's Choice categories—Favourite Male TV Star, Favourite Female TV Star, Favourite Music Performance on Film/TV, Favourite Presenter, Favourite Reality Star, International Film, US Male Screen Personality Film/TV, US Female Screen Personality Film/TV, West African Film Actor, West African Film Actress and West African Film—are all voted for by the public.

The 2007 awards ceremony saw actor Morgan Freeman honoured with the Outstanding Contribution Award, newsreader Moira Stuart honoured with the Edric Connor Inspiration Award and American TV director-producer Stan Lathan with the new Vanguard Award. A final honorary award - the Classic TV Award - was presented to the television series Roots in what was its 30th anniversary year.

The 2016 awards ceremony saw actor Wesley Snipes honoured with the Outstanding Contribution Award.

In 2017, the 12th Screen Nation awards took place. The Edric Connor Trailblazer award was given to Horace Ové .

2018 winners

2016 winners

2007 winners

2006 winners

2003 winners

2002 winners (as bfm Awards)

References

External links

Screen Nation Awards
Screen Nation Awards
2003 establishments in the United Kingdom
Awards established in 2003